Adolfo Feliciano (22 June 1930 – 1972) was a Filipino sports shooter. He competed at the 1960, 1964 and the 1968 Summer Olympics. He also competed in four editions of the Asian Games, from 1954 to 1966.

References

External links
 

1930 births
1972 deaths
Filipino male sport shooters
Olympic shooters of the Philippines
Shooters at the 1960 Summer Olympics
Shooters at the 1964 Summer Olympics
Shooters at the 1968 Summer Olympics
Sportspeople from Manila
Asian Games medalists in shooting
Shooters at the 1954 Asian Games
Shooters at the 1958 Asian Games
Shooters at the 1962 Asian Games
Shooters at the 1966 Asian Games
Medalists at the 1954 Asian Games
Medalists at the 1958 Asian Games
Medalists at the 1962 Asian Games
Medalists at the 1966 Asian Games
Asian Games gold medalists for the Philippines
Asian Games silver medalists for the Philippines
Asian Games bronze medalists for the Philippines
Philippine Sports Hall of Fame inductees
20th-century Filipino people